Lake Isabella is a village split between Sherman Township and Broomfield Township within Isabella County in the U.S. state of Michigan. The population grew to 1,681 people as of the 2010 Census, making the community one of the state's ten fastest growing communities in terms of percentage, with an increase of 35% from the 2000 Census, and an increase of 160% from 1990. The village shares the 48893 ZIP Code with several neighboring municipalities.

Geography

Demographics

The Village benefited from the real estate boom of the late 1990s and early 2000s. Since incorporating in May 1998 there have been 332 new homes built in the community. Of those, over 250 were built after the 2000 census. In addition to residential real estate development, the village's small commercial downtown began to development.

In terms of land area, Lake Isabella ranks as the state's second largest village.  As of the 2000 Census Lake Isabella was the 71st largest village in the state in terms of population.  The village also has a large street network of about 27 miles of streets which is the second largest street network for any village in Michigan.  As of 2011 the tax base for the community had grown to over $70 million, making it the 17th largest for all of Michigan's villages.

2010 census
As of the census of 2010, there were 1,681 people, 694 households, and 507 families residing in the village. The racial makeup of the village was 95.1% White, 0.4% African American, 1.1% Native American, 0.5% Asian, 0.1% Pacific Islander, 0.8% from other races, and 2.0% from two or more races. Hispanic or Latino of any race were 3.6% of the population.

There were 694 households, of which 29.1% had children under the age of 18 living with them, 62.2% were married couples living together, 7.5% had a female householder with no husband present, 3.3% had a male householder with no wife present, and 26.9% were non-families. 22.5% of all households were made up of individuals, and 9.1% had someone living alone who was 65 years of age or older. The average household size was 2.41 and the average family size was 2.80.

The median age in the village was 41.1 years. 22.4% of residents were under the age of 18; 6.2% were between the ages of 18 and 24; 25.6% were from 25 to 44; 28.1% were from 45 to 64; and 17.8% were 65 years of age or older. The gender makeup of the village was 49.0% male and 51.0% female.

2000 census
As of the census of 2000, there were 1,243 people, 529 households, and 399 families residing in the village. The racial makeup of the village was 95.66% White, 0.72% African American, 1.37% Native American, 0.24% Asian, 0.40% from other races, and 1.61% from two or more races. Hispanic or Latino of any race were 1.53% of the population.

There were 529 households, out of which 21.9% had children under the age of 18 living with them, 66.7% were married couples living together, 6.0% had a female householder with no husband present, and 24.4% were non-families. 19.5% of all households were made up of individuals, and 6.6% had someone living alone who was 65 years of age or older.  The average household size was 2.34 and the average family size was 2.62.

In the village, the population was spread out, with 18.3% under the age of 18, 5.8% from 18 to 24, 25.5% from 25 to 44, 33.0% from 45 to 64, and 17.4% who were 65 years of age or older.  The median age was 45 years. For every 100 females, there were 98.9 males.  For every 100 females age 18 and over, there were 99.8 males.

The median income for a household in the village was $40,833, and the median income for a family was $43,077. Males had a median income of $35,188 versus $27,115 for females. The per capita income for the village was $23,324.  About 7.8% of families and 11.3% of the population were below the poverty line, including 18.7% of those under age 18 and 1.1% of those age 65 or over.

References

External links
Lake Isabella Home Page

Villages in Isabella County, Michigan
Villages in Michigan